Ramazan Kurşunlu (born July 7, 1981 in Izmir, Turkey) is a Turkish retired footballer who most recently served as manager of Balıkesirspor.

Coaching career
Kurşunlu started his coaching career with Manisa Büyükşehir Belediyespor as a goalkeeper coach. In April 2016, he was also invited to coach the goalkeeper of the Turkish U16 national team for two games. In the following two year, he worked for Çaykur Rizespor (2017) and Alanyaspor (2018) as goalkeeper coach, before he on 6 December 2018 was appointed as manager of Bandırmaspor.

On 20 June 2019, Kurşunlu was appointed as the new manager of Menemen Belediyespor.

References

1981 births
Altay S.K. footballers
Beşiktaş J.K. footballers
Ankaraspor footballers
Living people
Turkish footballers
Süper Lig players

Association football goalkeepers